TransAlta Corporation (formerly Calgary Power Company, Ltd.) is an electricity power generator and wholesale marketing company headquartered in Calgary, Alberta, Canada. It is a privately owned corporation and its shares are traded publicly. It operates 76 power plants in Canada, the United States, and Australia. TransAlta operates wind, hydro, natural gas, and coal power generation facilities. The company has been recognized for its leadership in sustainability by the Dow Jones Sustainability North America Index, the FTSE4Good Index, and the Jantzi Social Index. TransAlta is Canada's largest investor-owned renewable energy provider. The company is not without controversy as the Alberta Utility Commission ruled in 2015 that TransAlta manipulated the price of electricity when it took outages at its Alberta coal-fired generating units in late 2010 and early 2011.

History
In 1909, TransAlta began the planning and construction of the Horseshoe Falls Hydro Plant in Seebe, Alberta. Two years later, Calgary Power Company, Ltd. was born.

That first dam was built by a crew of about 200 with primitive tools such as picks and wheelbarrows. It initially had a 10 MW capacity (13,500 horsepower).  A second dam was commissioned in 1913 at Kananaskis Falls and was built by close to 500 workers.

At the time, streetcars were responsible for a significant share of Calgary's electrical load. Residential power was just being introduced, and many homes were lit for the first time with electrical lamps because of Calgary Power.  Calgary Power's cheap energy is credited with Canadian Pacific Railway's decision to locate its regional engine repair shop in Ogden, Calgary, spurring the city's economic development.

Notable leaders from the company's early years included W. Max Aitken (later known as Lord Beaverbrook) and R.B. Bennett, who went on to become Canada's Prime Minister from 1930 to 1935.

The company's monopoly position and behaviour made its status as a private corporation unpopular among rural customers and some Calgary residents, and a move to nationalize it was converted to a province-wide referendum in 1948, which came down very narrowly on the side of maintaining its private ownership.

In 1981, the company changed its name to its current name of TransAlta Corporation.

At the end of 2010, TransAlta became the first company to own and operate more than 1,000 MW of installed wind capacity in Canada—almost 30 per cent of the country's total.

TransAlta has gradually been transitioning its energy-generating facilities away from coal, due to adverse environmental effects, towards natural gas. Its last remaining operational coal mine, in Highvale, AB, will cease mining operations on December 31, 2021, and transition to mine reclamation in the years to follow.

Ghost River Reservoir
Since the 2013 Alberta floods, as a temporary partial solution to mitigate flood damage during those months when there is a greater risk of rising water that might cause flooding, the Government of Alberta entered into an agreement with TransAlta to manage water on the Bow River at its Ghost Reservoir facility. This was extended in 2016 with a new five-year agreement that included water management of its Kananaskis Lakes system (which includes Interlakes, Pocaterra and Barrier) for drought mitigation.

Controversies
On March 21, 2014, the Alberta Market Surveillance Administrator (MSA) filed an application with the Alberta Utilities Commission (AUC) alleging TransAlta manipulated the price of electricity when it took outages at its Alberta coal-fired generating units in late 2010 and early 2011.

While TransAlta disputed the MSA's allegations, the AUC ruled TransAlta's actions in relation to four outage events spanning 11 days in 2010 and 2011 restricted or prevented a competitive response from the associated Power Purchase Agreement (PPA) buyers and manipulated market prices away from a competitive market outcome.

On Sept. 30, 2015, TransAlta and the province's MSA reached an agreement to settle all outstanding proceedings before the AUC. The settlement, which is in the form of a consent order, was approved by the AUC on Oct. 29, 2015.

Under the terms of the agreement, TransAlta paid a total amount of (CDN) $56 million that included approximately $27 million as a repayment of economic benefit, approximately $4 million to cover the MSA's legal and related costs, and a $25 million administrative penalty. As part of the settlement agreement, TransAlta agreed to discontinue its court appeal of the AUC's decision concerning the four outage events.

TransAlta's legal appeal came as a result of the AUC's determination in its ruling that the “MSA did not prove, on the balance of probabilities, that the company breached applicable legislation on the basis that its compliance policies, practices, and oversight thereof, were inadequate and deficient.”

In response to the dispute regarding its understanding of Alberta market rules governing forced outages, TransAlta implemented two independent, third-party reviews of its compliance procedures. The results of the reviews by McCarthy Tétrault and PricewaterhouseCoopers LLP were publicly released, including recommendations for improvement.

Hydro facilities in British Columbia 
Upper Mamquam, built by Canadian Hydro Developers and operational since 2005, is a run-of-the-river hydroelectric plant 5 km northeast of Squamish, BC. The penstock is 1.6 km long, dropping 120 meters to the powerhouse containing two 12.5 MW Pelton wheel generators.

Bone Creek a hydroelectric plant constructed in 2011, has a 5 km penstock dropping 148 meters to a powerhouse with two 9.6MW Francis turbines. It is located 90 km south of Valemount, BC and operated by Valisa Energy Inc. Approximately 72 GWh of power annually is sold to BC Hydro.

Akolkolex, built by Canadian Hydro Developers and operational since 1995, uses two Francis turbines in a 10 MW run-of-river hydroelectric plant discharging into Arrow Lakes. It is located 25 km SE of Revelstoke, B.C. The plant produces approximately 37 GWh of electricity annually.

Pingston Creek has a 12 meter high sheetpile rock-fill dam which diverts water to the western shore of Arrow Lakes. It was built by Canadian Hydro Developers and Brascan Power and began operation as Pingston Power Inc. in 2003. A 4 km tunnel achieves a huge drop of 557 meters to three 15 MW Pelton wheels to generate about 200 GWh annually. The project is 53 km south of Revelstoke, BC.

Energy generation summary

 8,128 megawatts (MW) of aggregate generation capacity (2020).
 24,980 gigawatt hours (GWh) were produced at an average plant availability of 90.3 per cent for the year ended December 31, 2020.
 76 facilities in three geographies: Canada, U.S., Australia
 One surface coal mine in operation: Highvale in Alberta, Canada. Its operations will transition to 100 per cent mine reclamation effective Jan. 1, 2022.

Net Capacity Owned by Fuel Type
(in operation and in development 2021)

Net Capacity Owned by Geography
(in operation and development)

See also

References

Citations

Sources 
TransAlta Annual Information Form – March 2, 2021
TransAlta Feb. 4, 2021 News Release (TransAlta and TransAlta Renewables Announce President and Chief Executive Officer Succession)
TransAlta QuickFacts
 TransAlta 2010 Report on Sustainability
 TransAlta History: Celebrating 100 Years
 Alberta Utilities Commission (AUC)
 Market Surveillance Administrator (MSA)
 Powering Generations: The TransAlta Story, 1911–2011

External links
 Company website
 TransAlta Corporation Careers

1911 establishments in Alberta
Companies based in Calgary
Companies listed on the New York Stock Exchange
Companies listed on the Toronto Stock Exchange
Energy companies established in 1911
Electric power companies of Canada
Canadian companies established in 1911